ARA Bahía Buen Suceso (B-6) was a Bahía Aguirre-class 5,000-ton fleet transport that served in the Argentine Navy from 1950 to 1982. She took part in the Falklands War as a logistics ship tasked with resupplying the Argentine garrisons scattered around the Falkland Islands. Captured by British forces on 15 June after running aground at Fox Bay, she sank in deep waters while being used as target practice by the Royal Navy on 21 October 1982.

History

The ship was constructed by Halifax Shipbuilding Limited at Halifax, Nova Scotia, Canada, and commissioned in June 1950 for service under the Transporte Navales command. In 1958 she carried the crew of the new aircraft carrier  to the United Kingdom. The vessel participated in numerous Antarctic supply missions. In October 1966, she transported the passengers, crew and hijackers of Aerolineas Argentinas DC-4 LV-AGG from the Falkland Islands to Ushuaia. The aircraft had been hijacked by a group of Argentine nationalists and flown to the islands three days earlier.

On 10 March 1969 she made a trip to Europe, visiting cities such as Genova, Bruges, Rotterdam, Amsterdam, Portsmouth, Edinburgh, and Dublin. The purpose of the trip was to carry wheat to Europe and bring military items to Argentina. While sailing through the English Channel, she collided with the tanker Asprella and was repaired at the Ferrol shipyard in Vigo, Spain.

Bahía Buen Suceso was often hired out to commercial companies, usually on coastal runs down to southern Argentina and also an annual summer tourist voyage to the Argentinian research bases in Antarctica. In 1972 she began regular service between the continent and the Falkland Islands.

Falklands war

The ship landed scrap-metal workers on South Georgia on 19 March 1982. She was involved in the blockade running to the Falkland Islands. She sailed from Stanley towards Falklands Sound on 29 April, before the first British attack. While heading to the south on 6 May, the ship spotted the schooner Penelope, property of the Falkland Islands Company, at anchor along a pier in Speedwell Island. The small craft was taken over by an Argentine prize crew the following day. Because the ship was so close to private homes, the Sea Harriers used their 30 mm ADEN cannons rather than general-purpose bombs. They damaged the ship's bridge and engine room, and set fire to a paint store and workshop ashore. One of the Sea Harriers was hit in the tail by a 7.62 mm bullet while strafing the transport; the aircraft was able to return to Hermes safely.

After the attack the ship did not sail again and remained moored in Fox Bay East. During a storm, she partially tore loose from her moorings and the bow swung onto the beach. After the war, Bahía Buen Suceso was towed to San Carlos Water by the tug Irishman. Her cargo of ammunition was unloaded.

Fate 
On 21 October 1982 her hull was towed out to deep water where it was sunk by a combination of naval gunfire and fire from Sea Harrier FRS.Mk.1s from 809 Naval Air Squadron. The ship was also hit by a torpedo from the submarine .

See also 
 List of auxiliary ships of the Argentine Navy

References

Notes

Bibliography

External links
 
 Photos of the ship 1 (Archived 2009-10-24)
 Photos of the ship 2 (Archived 2009-10-24)
 Photos of the ship 3 (Archived 2009-10-24)
 Photos of the ship 4 (Archived 2009-10-24)

Cold War auxiliary ships of Argentina
Transports of the Argentine Navy
Ships built in Nova Scotia
Shipwrecks of the Falklands War
Falklands War in South Georgia
Falklands War naval ships of Argentina
Ships sunk as targets
Maritime incidents in 1969
Maritime incidents in 1982
1950 ships
Ships sunk with no fatalities
Captured ships